Nowata County is a county located in northeastern Oklahoma, United States, on the Kansas border. As of the 2010 census, its population is 10,536. Its county seat is Nowata. Their name is derived from a Delaware word, no-we-ata, meaning "come here" or "welcome".

History

For millennia, the land now known as Oklahoma was inhabited by Native Americans.  The Encyclopedia of Oklahoma History and Culture states that archaeological evidence indicates that humans first lived in this area in the Verdigris River valley over six thousand years ago.  In the 17th century, white trappers first visiting the area found it occupied mostly by the Osage and Quapaw tribes.  It was recognized as Osage territory by the time United States secured it as part of the Louisiana Purchase in 1803.  In 1819, the Arkansas Territory was organized, then was split in 1824 and 1828.  An 1828 treaty with the Cherokee Nation assigned the area of Nowata County to the Cherokees, who included it in 1856 in their newly created Cooweescoowee District. The Cherokees and the Delaware signed a treaty in 1867 that resulted in Delaware settlements near the present towns of Delaware, Lenapah and Nowata, Oklahoma.

The state of Oklahoma and Nowata County was established in 1907, and the county had a population of 10,453.  The town of Nowata was named as county seat. The exact origin is unknown, but the two most common stories are that railroad surveyors used the Delaware word noweta for welcome or that a sign was posted indicating that local springs had no water: No wata.

Geography

The Verdigris River divides the county into eastern and western halves. Creeks in the extreme western part of the county drain into the Caney River. All other creeks drain into the Verdigris River. Lake Oologah lies partly in this county.

Major highways
  U.S. Highway 60
  U.S. Highway 169
  State Highway 10
  State Highway 28

Adjacent counties
 Montgomery County, Kansas (north)
 Labette County, Kansas (northeast)
 Craig County (east)
 Rogers County (south)
 Washington County (west)

Demographics

As of the census of 2000, there were 10,569 people, 4,147 households, and 2,989 families residing in the county.  The population density was 7/km2 (19/mi2).  There were 4,705 housing units at an average density of 3/km2 (8/mi2).  The racial makeup of the county was 72.43% White, 2.46% Black or African American, 16.56% Native American, 0.12% Asian, 0.26% from other races, and 8.17% from two or more races.  1.23% of the population were Hispanic or Latino of any race.

There were 4,147 households, out of which 31.80% had children under the age of 18 living with them, 58.80% were married couples living together, 9.80% had a female householder with no husband present, and 27.90% were non-families. 25.50% of all households were made up of individuals, and 13.30% had someone living alone who was 65 years of age or older.  The average household size was 2.50 and the average family size was 2.97.

In the county, the population was spread out, with 26.10% under the age of 18, 7.60% from 18 to 24, 25.30% from 25 to 44, 23.70% from 45 to 64, and 17.30% who were 65 years of age or older.  The median age was 39 years. For every 100 females there were 96.70 males.  For every 100 females age 18 and over, there were 93.20 males.

The median income for a household in the county was $29,470, and the median income for a family was $36,354. Males had a median income of $27,047 versus $19,371 for females. The per capita income for the county was $14,244.  About 9.00% of families and 14.10% of the population were below the poverty line, including 18.00% of those under age 18 and 11.30% of those age 65 or over.

Economy
The economy of Nowata County has been based on agriculture. The most important crops are wheat, corn, oats, and sorghum. Cattle raising is also important to the local economy.

Government
The county operates the Nowata County Jail. In 2019 the county government wanted the jail to be open even though there had been a carbon monoxide leak around three weeks prior. The sheriff and several deputies resigned.

The county has renamed or renumbered many addresses so that emergency first responders will be better able to find locations from which 9-1-1 calls have been placed.

Politics

Communities
 Delaware
 Lenapah
 New Alluwe
 Nowata (county seat)
 South Coffeyville
 Wann
 Childers

Historic Places

The following sites in Nowata County are listed on the National Register of Historic Places:
 Cemetery Patent 110, Delaware
 Diamond Point School, Nowata
 Nowata County Courthouse, Nowata

References

 
1907 establishments in Oklahoma
Populated places established in 1907